Haiti Ambassador Airlines was an airline based in Port-au-Prince, Haiti. It was a private airline operating an international service to New York, USA.

History
The airline was established in April 2002 and started operations in 2003. It is owned by Christopher Doyle (48%), Georgemay Figaro, Airline President (48%), Jean-Philippe Padern (2%) and Kathleen Buteau (2%).

Services
Haiti Ambassador Airlines operated an international service between Port-au-Prince and New York (John F. Kennedy International Airport) in January 2005.

Fleet
The Haiti Ambassador Airlines fleet consisted of 1 Boeing 767-300 aircraft leased from LAN in January 2005.

Defunct airlines of Haiti
Airlines established in 2002
2002 establishments in Haiti
Companies based in Port-au-Prince